The Human Ken Doll may refer to:
 Justin Jedlica, an American personality born in 1980 who has undergone a number of plastic surgeries 
 Roddy Alves, a Brazilian personality born in 1983 who has also undergone a number of plastic surgeries